Sushanth Mathew (born 18 May 1981) is a retired Indian professional footballer who played as a defender or midfielder, who currently works as a technical director and coach in academies.

Career
Sushanth was born in the Ambalavayal, Wayanad, Kerala. He showed glimpses of his skills for his school team, from where he pursued his footballing career to a local club named the Dyna FC. He graduated from Farook College, Calicut, where he represented the university team.

He was called for the Kerala Santhosh Trophy camp at Kochi. This helped him to join the FC Cochin in the season 1997–98.

He played for three years for FC Kochin, playing alongside his boyhood hero I. M. Vijayan. He was acquired by Vasco S.C. Another three years of consistent performances at the goan club earned him a move to the Mahindra United, for whom he played for six years. He then moved to East Bengal in 2010, remaining two years. He then joined Mohun Bagan for the 2012-13 season, playing four I-League matches.

Rangdajied United
On 13 January 2014 Mathew signed for Rangdajied United F.C. on loan from IMG RELIANCE. He made his debut in the I-League on 11 February 2014 against Churchill Brothers at the Tilak Maidan Stadium in which he started and played until the 89th minute before being replaced by Sandesh Gadkari as Rangdajied lost the match 1-0.

Kerala Blasters
He became the first Malayali player to be drafted into the Kochi based squad on day one of the draft picks for the inaugural edition of the Indian Super League. Trevor Morgan who mentored him in East Bengal was influential in selecting him.

Sushanth played just 56 minutes over four matches for the Blasters in the inaugural season.

However, on 13 December 2014, Sushanth scored a long-range goal for Kerala Blasters in the first leg of semi-final match against Chennaiyin FC at Jawaharlal Nehru Stadium, Kochi, which made him an instant hero and propelled the team to the finals. It is considered to be one of the best goals in the history of Kerala Blasters as well as Indian Super League.

After his retirement, ISL media team had an interview with him, below is an excerpt about the strike:

"I must say I have a lot of fantastic memories from my football career - sharing dressing rooms and playing with world football stars, etc. But ‘that’ goal, I will cherish always. That goal made me a hero to the Kerala fans, I so adore, almost overnight. I still get messages from fans and well-wishers saying that they still have goosebumps whenever they watch that goal. A lot of them keep insisting that it is the best goal in Hero ISL so far. I feel very fortunate to be remembered so fondly."

FC Pune City
In July 2015, Mathew was drafted to play for FC Pune City in the 2015 Indian Super League.

After playing just thrice for the Stallions, he suffered a horrific injury following a late tackle by former France international Florent Malouda. The injury kept Mathew out for the season and marked the end of his time in the Hero ISL.

Gokulam FC
In January 2017, Sushanth joined the Kerala based I-League club Gokulam Kerala FC.

References

External links
 Profile at Goal.com
 

Indian footballers
People from Wayanad district
Footballers from Kerala
1981 births
Living people
Malayali people
I-League players
Vasco SC players
Mahindra United FC players
East Bengal Club players
Mohun Bagan AC players
Rangdajied United F.C. players
Sushanth Mathew
FC Pune City players
Indian Super League players
Association football defenders
Association football midfielders
Sushanth Mathew